Dinaz may refer to:

Dinaz, part of the French hip hop duo Djadja & Dinaz
FC Dinaz Vyshhorod, a Ukrainian professional football club from Vyshhorod